The Cog Factory, formerly located at 2224 Leavenworth Street in Omaha, Nebraska, was a 501(c)(3) non-profit organization that provided a punk rock music performance space for the area. The facility opened in 1994 with bands Ritual Device, Sideshow and Mousetrap. Musician Conor Oberst began making public performances there in the 1990s. Cog Factory closed permanently in January 2002.

About
Serving as the foothold for the Omaha punk rock, hardcore, ska, and indie scene for many years, the Cog Factory was an all-ages venue located in Omaha's downtown core near the historic Old Market. Founded by self described "DIY-Punk" Robb Rathe, the Cog Factory served as the launching pad for the careers of many Saddle Creek Records bands, as well as being a tour stop for national acts. Cog Factory also promoted shows at Sokol Auditorium when the draw was too large for its own club.

Structure
The Cog Factory was a non-profit 501(c)3 organization run strictly by volunteers. All the proceeds from shows were used to cover the building expenses and payment of artists. Numerous volunteers tried keeping the club going until 2002, when Cog Factory ceased to operate. With all the original founding volunteers no longer operating Cog Factory after 2001, its original goal of providing an all-ages venue for every type of independent music free of discrimination started to erode.  The club's organizational structure broke down, sufficient funds were no longer being earned, and the location was closed.

Legacy
Footage of the venue is shown in the Spend an Evening with Saddle Creek documentary.

Notable performers

Acid Bath
AFI
Against All Authority
All Out War
American Nightmare
Archers of Loaf
The Ataris
Avail
Bane
Bleeding Through
Bogdan Raczynski
Boris The Sprinkler
BoySetsFire
Brainiac
Bright Eyes
Buck-O-Nine
Buried Alive
Catch 22
Cave In
Clayface
Coalesce
Commander Venus
Converge
C'mon Jack
Cows    
Crash Worship 
Cursive
Darkest Hour
Dillinger Four
The Dillinger Escape Plan
Disembodied
The Donnas
D.R.I.
Dropkick Murphys
Earth Crisis
Eighteen Visions
Ensign
Every Time I Die
Fast Orange
Fischer
Frontier Trust
The Faint
The Gadjits
Gas Huffer
Good Riddance
Grade
Groovie Ghoulies
Guttermouth
H2O
Hammerhead
Hatebreed
The Haunted(Swedish band)
Indecision
Isis (band)
Jawbox
The Jesus Lizard
Jimmy Skaffa
Jive Monkeys
The Juliana Theory
Karate
Kid Dynamite
The Lawrence Arms
Leatherface
Man or Astro-man?
Mercy Rule
Midtown
Milemarker
The Mountain Goats
Mousetrap
Murphy's Law
Mustard Plug
MU330
Neurosis
Neva Dinova
New Found Glory
No Innocent Victim
One King Down
Overcast
Pageninetynine
Park Ave.
Poison The Well
Propaghandi
Q and Not U
Rancid
Red Menace
REVILO
Rocket Fuel Is The Key
ROW8P30
Rye Coalition
Saetia
Season To Risk
Skankin' Pickle
Skavoovie and the Epitones
Slowdown Virginia
Small Brown Bike
Smart Went Crazy
Solid Jackson
Sorry About Dresden
Spoon
The Suicide Machines
Ten Yard Fight
Titanium White
Today Is The Day
Total Chaos
Thrice
Throwdown
Tribe 8
Twelve Tribes
UK Subs
Unearth
Underoath
Unsane
Warzone
Wesley Willis
Witchery
X-Cops
Zao

See also
Music in Omaha

References

External links
Lazy-i Interview: October 1998 with Rob Rathe (the original operator)
Lazy-i Interview: October 1998 with Chris Harding (the new operator)

Music venues completed in 1994
Former music venues in the United States
Music venues in Omaha, Nebraska
Non-profit organizations based in Nebraska
2002 disestablishments in Nebraska
Organizations based in Omaha, Nebraska
1994 establishments in Nebraska